David Bernhardt (born 1 December 1997) is a Swedish professional ice hockey defenseman. He is currently playing with the Modo Hockey of the Swedish HockeyAllsvenskan (Allsv). Bernhardt was selected by the Philadelphia Flyers in the seventh round (199th overall) of the 2016 NHL Entry Draft.

Playing career
Bernhardt made his Swedish Hockey League debut playing with Djurgårdens IF during the 2016–17 SHL season. On 26 November 2016, he agreed to an additional one-year contract extension until 2018 with Djurgården.

During the 2018–19 season, having tallied just 1 assist in 16 games in the final year of his contract with Djurgårdens IF, Bernhardt was released and signed by rival club, Växjö Lakers, to a new three-year contract on 4 January 2019.

David's older brother Daniel was also formerly a prospect with the Djurgårdens IF organization, and was drafted by the New York Rangers in 2015.

Career statistics

Regular season and playoffs

International

References

External links

1997 births
Living people
Djurgårdens IF Hockey players
HIFK (ice hockey) players
Modo Hockey players
Philadelphia Flyers draft picks
SaiPa players
Swedish ice hockey defencemen
Växjö Lakers players